Poa badensis is a species of grass (family Poaceae), native to central and southeastern Europe, and the Caucasus region. It is a relict species of a calcareous rock/sand steppe type now rare in Europe.

References

badensis
Flora of France
Flora of Central Europe
Flora of Southeastern Europe
Flora of the Caucasus
Flora of Iran
Plants described in 1797